Kustas Kikerpuu (19 October 1937 Tallinn – 20 October 2008 Tallinn) was an Estonian composer, jazz musician and conductor.

In 1961, he graduated from Tallinn Music School (nowadays Georg Ots Tallinn Music College) in choral conducting.

1965–1976, he worked at Estonian Television as a conductor of ensemble and music editor. 1976–1985, he was a music director for the advertisement office Eesti Reklaamfilm.

Since 1983, he was a member of Estonian Composers' Union.

Awards
 1983 Estonian SSR annual prize for music
 2006 Annual Prize of the Endowment for Music of the Cultural Endowment of Estonia
 2001 Order of the White Star, IV class

Songs and arrangements

 "Horoskoop"
 "Langevate lehtede aegu"
 "Meie kaks"
 "Suudluse ma saan"
 "Mul meeles veel"
 "Kannikesed emale"
 "Sulle kõik nüüd ütlen"
 "Väike neiu"
 "Lõppenud on päevad"
 "Korraks vaid"
 "Pilvevatimees"
 "See kaunis maa"

References

1937 births
2008 deaths
20th-century Estonian composers
21st-century Estonian composers
Estonian conductors (music)
Recipients of the Order of the White Star, 4th Class
Musicians from Tallinn
Tallinn Georg Ots Music School alumni